Anycles is a genus of moths in the subfamily Arctiinae. The genus was erected by Francis Walker in 1854.

Species
 Anycles anthracina Walker, 1854
 Anycles brinkleyi Rothschild, 1912
 Anycles cupreus Schaus, 1901
 Anycles dolosus Walker, 1854
 Anycles tenebrosa Rothschild, 1912

References

Euchromiina
Moth genera